Gladue Lake 105B is an Indigenous reserve of the Flying Dust First Nation in Saskatchewan, Canada. It is in Township 63, Range 15, west of the Third Meridian, in the Jarvis Lake area.

References

Indian reserves in Saskatchewan
Division No. 17, Saskatchewan